Hirotsu is a Japanese surname. Notable people with the surname include:

Eiji Hirotsu (born 1967), Japanese rugby union player
Kazuo Hirotsu (1891–1968), Japanese novelist, literary critic and translator
Momoko Hirotsu (1918–1988), Japanese novelist
Motoko Hirotsu (born 1953), Japanese politician 
Ryūrō Hirotsu, also Hirotsu Ryūrō  (1861–1928), Japanese novelist

References

Japanese-language surnames